Serine/threonine-protein phosphatase 2A 65 kDa regulatory subunit A beta isoform is an enzyme that in humans is encoded by the PPP2R1B gene.

Function 

This gene encodes a constant regulatory subunit of protein phosphatase 2. Protein phosphatase 2 is one of the four major Ser/Thr phosphatases, and it is implicated in the negative control of cell growth and division. It consists of a common heteromeric core enzyme, which is composed of a catalytic subunit and a constant regulatory subunit, that associates with a variety of regulatory subunits. The constant regulatory subunit A serves as a scaffolding molecule to coordinate the assembly of the catalytic subunit and a variable regulatory B subunit. This gene encodes a beta isoform of the constant regulatory subunit A. Defects in this gene could be the cause of some lung and colon cancers. At least two transcript variants encoding different isoforms have been found for this gene.

Interactions 

PPP2R1B has been shown to interact with:

 PPP2CA,
 PPP2CB,
 PPP2R2A, 
 PPP2R3B, 
 PPP2R5A, 
 PPP2R5B, 
 PPP2R5C, 
 PPP2R5D,  and
 PPP2R5E.

References

Further reading